Squid Girl, known in Japan as Shinryaku! Ika Musume (Invasion! Squid Girl), is an anime series produced by Diomedea based on the comedy manga series by Masahiro Anbe published in Weekly Shōnen Champion. The series tells of a Squid Girl who seeks to invade humanity as revenge for the pollution of the seas. However, due to accidentally breaking the wall of a beach house, she is forced to work as a waitress to pay off the damages.

The first season aired on TV Tokyo between October 4 and December 20, 2010, and was also released with English subtitles on Crunchyroll. The fifth and sixth DVD/Blu-ray volumes, released on April 20, 2011 and May 18, 2011, contain short "Mini-Ika Musume" episodes. A second anime season titled Shinryaku!? Ika Musume aired in Japan between September 26 and December 26, 2011. Three original video animation (OVA) episodes were released on August 8, 2012, June 7, 2013, and September 9, 2014 respectively. Crunchyroll began streaming the OVAs in February 2014.

Media Blasters licensed the anime in North America under the title Squid Girl. The first season was released on two DVD volumes on September 27 and December 6, 2011, respectively, followed by a Blu-ray Disc release on March 13, 2012. Media Blasters will also be releasing the second season. The first season was released on DVD in the United Kingdom by Manga Entertainment on August 13, 2012.

The first season uses two pieces of theme music: one opening theme and one ending theme.

In Japanese, each episode's title is in the form of a negative question in order to end with nai ka and thus make a pun with the Japanese word for squid ika. The last two syllables (i, ka) are written with katakana instead of hiragana in order to emphasize the pun. Example:

Episode list

Shinryaku! Ika Musume (2010)

Bonus episodes

Shinryaku!? Ika Musume (2011)

Shinryaku!! Ika Musume (OVAs)

Notes

References
General
 List of Squid Girl season one episodes 

Specific

External links
 Official website 
 Squid Girl episodes at TV Tokyo 
 

Lists of anime episodes